Erythroxylum australe is a shrub or small tree endemic to northern Australia. The plant is known by a variety of names including Brigalow erythroxylon shrub and dogwood (unrelated to Cornus).

The plant grows in a wide variety of habitats in subcoastal and coastal regions, ranging from dry rainforest and vine thickets to open savanna woodland.

The leaves contain 0.8% meteloidine, an alkaloid similar to cocaine. All Erythroxylaceae species are banned in NSW.

References

australe
Flora of Queensland
Endemic flora of Australia
Malpighiales of Australia
Trees of Australia
Taxa named by Ferdinand von Mueller